Tizón or Tizon may refer to:

Alex Tizon (1959–2017), Filipino-American author and Pulitzer Prize-winning journalist
Allan Wagner Tizón (born 1942), Peruvian diplomat, Minister of Foreign Affairs
Arturo Tizón (1984–2021), Spanish motorcycle racer
Aurelia Gabriela Tizón de Perón (1902–1938), Argentine educator, wife of former Argentine president Juan Perón
Eloy Tizón (born 1964), Spanish writer
Héctor Tizón (1929–2012), Argentinian writer, journalist, lawyer, judge, and diplomat
Jose Ramon Tizon Villarin, Filipino Jesuit priest and scientist
Juan Tizón (1895–1945), Spanish politician and writer exiled during the Spanish Civil War
Ventura Rodríguez Tizón (1717–1785), Spanish architect and artist

See also
Tizon, the name of one of the swords carried by Rodrigo Díaz de Vivar, El Cid